The 1861 New Hampshire gubernatorial election was held on March 12, 1861.

Incumbent Republican Governor Ichabod Goodwin did not stand for re-election.

Republican nominee Nathaniel S. Berry defeated Democratic nominee George Stark with 52.82% of the vote.

General election

Candidates
Nathaniel S. Berry, Republican, probate judge for Grafton County, Free Soil nominee for Governor from 1846 to 1850
George Stark, Democratic, civil engineer, brigadier-general of the third brigade of New Hampshire militia
Levi Bartlett, Constitutional Union Party

Withdrew
Benning W. Jenness, Breckinridge Democrat, former U.S. Senator

Results

Notes

References

1861
New Hampshire
Gubernatorial